Diego Minguens (born 25 January 1955) is an Argentine sailor. He competed in the Tornado event at the 1988 Summer Olympics.

References

External links
 

1955 births
Living people
Argentine male sailors (sport)
Olympic sailors of Argentina
Sailors at the 1988 Summer Olympics – Tornado
Place of birth missing (living people)